A Treaty of Peace, Amity, Commerce and Navigation (Hanja: 朝美修好通商條約), also known as the Shufeldt Treaty, was negotiated between representatives of the United States and Korea in 1882.

The treaty was written in English and Hanja, with the final draft being accepted at Chemulpo (present day Incheon) near the Korean capital of Hanseong (now Seoul) in April and May 1884. It was Korea's first treaty with a western nation. It was also an unfair treaty including most favoured nation clause. After the United States signed the Taft–Katsura agreement the intervention clause was neglected.

Background
In 1876, Korea established a trade treaty with Japan after Japanese ships approached Ganghwado and threatened to fire on the Korean capital city. Treaty negotiations with the U.S. and with several European countries were made possible by the completion of this initial Japanese overture.

Negotiations with Qing were a significant feature of the process which resulted in this treaty. The Chinese played a significant role in the treaty negotiation, although Korea was an independent country at the time, which was explicitly mentioned in the treaty.

Treaty provisions
The United States and Korea negotiated and approved a 14 article treaty.  The treaty established mutual friendship and mutual assistance in case of attack; and the treaty also addressed such specific matters as extraterritorial rights for U.S. citizens in Korea and most favored nation trade status.

Abstract
The treaty encompasses a range of subjects.
Article 1 provides:

 Article 2 ... exchange of diplomatic and consular representatives
 Article 3 ... United States vessels wrecked on coast of Korea
 Article 4 ... United States extraterritorial jurisdiction over its citizens in Korea
 Article 5 ... merchants and merchant vessels shall reciprocally pay duties
 Article 6 ... reciprocal rights of residence and protection of citizens of both nations
 Article 7 ... prohibiting export or import of opium
 Article 8 ... export of "breadstuffs" and red ginseng
 Article 9 ... regulating importation of arms and ammunition
 Article 10 .. reciprocal rights to employing native labor
 Article 11 .. students exchanges
 Article 14 .. the usual most-favored-nation clause

The treaty remained in effect until the annexation of Korea in 1910.

Aftermath
The U.S. treaty established a template which was explicitly modeled in treaties with European nations — Germany in 1883, Russia and Italy in 1884, France in 1886, and others as well.

The treaty remained in effect even after the Japanese protectorate was established in 1905, but ended with the Japanese annexation of Korea in 1910.

See also

 United States expedition to Korea
 Korean Empire (1897)
 Taft–Katsura agreement (1905)
 Hague Secret Emissary Affair (1907)
 Japan–Korea Treaty of 1905
 Japan–Korea Treaty of 1910

Notes

References
 Kang, Woong Joe. (2005). The Korean Struggle for International Identity in the Foreground of the Shufeldt Negotiation, 1866-1882. Lanham, Maryland: University Press of America. ; 
 Kang, Jae-un. (2006). The Land of Scholars: Two Thousand Years of Korean Confucianism. Paramus, New Jersey: Homa & Sekey Books. ; 
 Kim, Chun-gil. (2005). The History of Korea. Westport, Connecticut: Greenwood Press. ; 
 Korean Mission to the Conference on the Limitation of Armament, Washington, D.C., 1921-1922. (1922). Korea's Appeal to the Conference on Limitation of Armament. Washington: U.S. Government Printing Office. 
 Yŏng-ho Ch'oe; William Theodore De Bary; Martina Deuchler and Peter Hacksoo Lee. (2000). Sources of Korean Tradition: From the Sixteenth to the Twentieth Centuries. New York: Columbia University Press. ; ; 
 Pletcher, David M. (2001). The Diplomacy of Involvement: American Economic Expansion Across the Pacific, 1784-1900. Columbia: University of Missouri Press. ;

Further reading
 Arrighi, Giovanni; Hamashita, Takeshi and Selden, Mark. (2003). The Resurgence of East Asia: 500, 150 and 50 year Perspectives. London" Routledge. ; 
 Walter, Gary D.  "The Korean Special Mission to the United States of America in 1883," Journal of Korean Studies, Vol. 1, No. 1, July–December 1969, pp. 89–142.

External links
 The 1882 U.S. and Korea Treaty: Draft and Final Versions

Unequal treaties
Treaties of the United States
Treaties of the Joseon dynasty
Treaties of the Korean Empire
1882 in Korea
1882 in the United States
1882 treaties
Korea–United States relations